Castle Bytham quarry is a disused quarry located close to the centre of the village of Castle Bytham, Lincolnshire, England.  It is famous for the exposure of Laeviuscula Zone ammonite fauna has allowed the dating of the Upper Lincolnshire limestone formation to the Bajocian era, and thereby dating other deposits around Europe.

When the quarry was opened in the 1850s a Bronze Age arrowhead and a Saxon burial were found in the overburden.

Although Ironstone quarrying was common to the west and north, this quarry was worked for Limestone.  A kiln adjacent to the railway line was used to produce slaked lime for the agricultural trade and a small amount of cement.  The quarry was worked by the ''Castle Lime company'.

The quarry has been left to return to nature since its closure and is now a recognised Site of Special Scientific Interest or SSSI.  It has most recently been used as a temporary car park for the annual Castle Bytham Mid-Summer Fair but is otherwise unused. The present owner of the quarry made efforts in 2004 to turn the quarry into an industrial complex of offices and small industrial units.

Thunderbolt Pit, The small quarry to the North of the Little Bytham road, just past the former railway bridge, is in another small outcrop of the same stratification, on the other side of the river.  It was not operated by Castle Lime.

See also
List of Sites of Special Scientific Interest in Lincolnshire
List of types of limestone

References

External links
www.thebythams.org.uk Images of the quarry as it was in 2003
Natural England data sheet
Railway history, including an image of the station at Castle Bytham with the Lime Kiln on the left

Geography of Lincolnshire
Sites of Special Scientific Interest in Lincolnshire
Bytham
Lime kilns in the United Kingdom
Quarries in England